Silences is the second studio album by American singer-songwriter Adia Victoria. It was released in February 2019 under Atlantic Records.

Track listing

References

2019 albums
Atlantic Records albums
Gothic country albums